U.S. Route 11 (US 11) runs southwest to northeast across northcentral Alabama for . It enters the state from Mississippi concurrent with US 80 and exits into Georgia east of Sulphur Springs. US 11 runs through the major cities of Tuscaloosa and Birmingham, as well as the smaller cities and towns of Cuba, York, Livingston, Epes, Boligee, Eutaw, Cottondale, Coaling, Woodstock, Bessemer, Brighton, Midfield, Trussville, Argo, Springville, Ashville, Steele, Attalla, Reece City, and Collinsville. State Route 7 (SR 7) is designated along the entire route but unsigned.

Aside from portions within major cities and towns, US 11 is largely a rural two-lane road. The route has been largely supplanted by Interstate 59 (I-59), as well as I-20 between Mississippi and Birmingham.

Route description

Mississippi state line to Tuscaloosa
Starting at the Mississippi state line, US 11, along with US 80, travel northeast toward Cuba. In this location, US 80 turns eastward onto a four-lane divided highway. Continuing on US 11, it intersects SR 17 in York, SR 28 in Livingston (where the University of West Alabama is located), and SR 39 near Epes. After traversing through Epes, US 11 crosses above the Tombigbee River south of Fort Tombecbe, part of the Tennessee–Tombigbee Waterway.

Going further, US 11 traverses through Boligee and then through Eutaw. In Eutaw, the route intersects two different routes at the Greene County Courthouse Square District: US 43 and SR 14. While SR 14 briefly runs concurrently with US 11, US 43 runs concurrently with it longer. After leaving Eutaw, both U.S. Highways stumble across I-20/I-59 in Knoxville. From there, both routes travel on a local road serving Ralph and Fosters. After crossing above the Black Warrior River, the road approaches Tuscaloosa. Along the way, they intersect Joe Mallisham Parkway. In downtown, they come across Stillman College. After that, US 43 branches north along SR 69 while US 11 travels south along I-359/SR 69.

Tuscaloosa to Downtown Birmingham

As the three routes meet I-20/I-59, I-359 ends while the rest continues as a local road. Shortly after US 11 leaves the freeway, it then turns east along Skyland Boulevard. Along the way, the route meets SR 215, US 82, and I-20/I-59. As the route leaves Tuscaloosa, it intersects SR 215 in Cottondale for the second time. The route then meets the same interstate freeway for the fourth time that it parallels. It then passes through Coaling, Vance, and Woodstock. In Woodstock, it begins to run concurrently with SR 5. After that, both routes then travel along the I-20/I-59 freeway. East of Lake View, four of the routes on the freeway then meet SR 316. After that, the freeway then comes across I-459 near McCalla.

Shortly after I-459, US 11, as well as SR 5, leave the freeway and then onto 9th Avenue Southwest. They then go through several suburbs of Birmingham. As they approach downtown, SR 5 turned northwest onto US 78 while US 11 continues east along US 78. After that, the road becomes a short one-way pair and then comes across I-65. Then, US 78 branches east while US 11 continues northeast. Shortly thereafter, the route meets US 31/US 280.

Downtown Birmingham to the Georgia state line
At this point, US 11 runs through industries and railroads in Birmingham. It then comes across Messer Airport Highway, a local road that connects to Birmingham–Shuttlesworth International Airport. After meeting I-20 for the last time, US 11 no longer parallels I-20. The route then meets I-59, SR 75, I-459, several more state routes, and US 231 in several locations. It then meets US 278/US 431 near Gadsden. After that, it continues to meet even more state routes, as well as I-59, along the rest of the route. It eventually crosses the Georgia state line.

History

Major intersections

References

External links

 Alabama
Transportation in Sumter County, Alabama
Transportation in Greene County, Alabama
Transportation in Tuscaloosa County, Alabama
Transportation in Bibb County, Alabama
Transportation in Jefferson County, Alabama
Transportation in St. Clair County, Alabama
Transportation in Etowah County, Alabama
Transportation in DeKalb County, Alabama
11